It's a Jungle is an EP by American rock band Three Dog Night, released in 1983.

Track listing

Personnel
Mike Allsup - guitar
Jimmy Greenspoon - keyboards
Richard Grossman - bass
Danny Hutton - vocals
Chuck Negron - vocals
Floyd Sneed - drums
Cory Wells - vocals

Session players
Bruce Gowdy - guitar
Tris Imboden - drums
Mark Leonard - bass
Jay Gruska - keyboards
Greg Hilfman - keyboards
Duane Hitchings - synthesizer

Production
Producer: Richard Podolor

Music videos
A music video was released accompanying the single off the album, "It's a Jungle Out There". Although the exact meaning is disputed, it shows an attractive woman in a "watering hole" being flirted with by the band's three lead vocalists and other bystanders. After the woman has had enough, she goes on dates with the singers and a bystander, then vanishes into thin air while on the date, tricking them into thinking she was actually in love with each, when in reality, it was only a plot to get rid of them. The video ends with a shot of her sitting alone in the "watering hole", having tricked and scared off every man who was interested in her.

The video was released on the Stet recording label and received "Light" and "Medium" screenplay.

Another video was recorded for "Shot in the Dark", directed by David Minasian. Although never commercially released, it was filmed on the set of the television program Fantasy Island, and on the streets of Beverly Hills, California.

Charts
The album failed to sell to its full potential due to its label, Passport, going bankrupt. However, it sold a certified 60,000 copies, which rose over time to an estimated total of 200,000 to 300,000 copies.

Album

Singles

References

1983 albums
Three Dog Night albums
Albums produced by Richard Podolor
Passport Records albums